Shuttle traders were people engaged in the practice of shuttle trading in late Soviet Union and post-soviet states in which traders shuttle backwards and forwards in and out of the country buying goods and then selling them within the country. Originated during the perestroika times, it extended well beyond time of the collapse of the Soviet Union.

The OECD defines shuttle trade as "the activity in which individual entrepreneurs buy goods abroad and import them for resale in street markets or small shops. Often the goods are imported without full declaration in order to avoid import duties."

See also
Bag people

External links
 Jamestown.org article
 OECD Glossary of Statistical Terms definition
 Zabyelina, Y. (2012). “Costs and Benefits of Informal Economy: Shuttle Trade and Crime at Cherkizovsky Market.” Global Crime, Volume 13, No. 2, pp. 95-108.

Economy of Russia
Second economy of the Soviet Union

References